Rourkela Junction railway station (station code:- ROU) is a railway junction located in the north-western part of the Indian state of Odisha and serves Rourkela in Sundergarh district. Rourkela is the third-largest urban agglomeration in Odisha.

History 
Rourkela railway station came up with the opening of the Nagpur–Asansol main line of Bengal Nagpur Railway in 1891. It became a station on the crosscountry Howrah–Nagpur–Mumbai line in 1900. Rourkela was connected to Barsuan iron ore mines in 1960. In earlier days the railway station of Rourkela was within the village of Mahulpali. The railway station gained in importance with the setting up of India's first public sector steel plant at Rourkela in the nineteen fifties. It was electrified in 1961–62.

Busy station
Rourkela railway station is amongst the top hundred booking stations of Indian Railway. 10 trains originate at Rourkela and 101 trains(including weeklies and bi-weeklies) pass through it. It is situated on the Kolkata–Mumbai South Eastern railway line which is a major route connecting the two metros of India. Rourkela is connected to Mumbai, Delhi, Kolkata, Asansol, Ranchi, Bangalore, Chennai, Pune, Ahmedabad, Bhubaneswar, Nagpur, Patna, Vishakhapatnam, Jamshedpur, Raipur, Cuttack, Puri, Berhampur, Sambalpur and Jammu & Kashmir and Ranchi.

Bimlagarh–Talcher project
This line when complete would reduce the distance between Rourkela and Bhubaneswar, the state capital, from 460 km (via Sambalpur) to 300 km.

Bondamunda - Rourkela (Diesel & Electric) Locomotive Shed 
Two locomotive sheds, one for steam locomotives and the other for diesel locomotives, was set up at Bondamunda in the 1950s. The steam locomotive shed was closed in the late 1980s. An electric locomotive shed was started in 1983 to accommodating six WAM-4 locomotives. As of 2019, it accommodates 242 electric locomotives and is being expanded. A new electric locomotive shed is under construction having capacity of 200 WAG-9 locomotives.

References

External links
Trains at Rourkela

Railway stations in Sundergarh district
Railway junction stations in Odisha
Chakradharpur railway division
Railway stations in India opened in 1891
Transport in Rourkela